Caldones is a parish of the municipality of Gijón / Xixón, in Asturias, Spain.

Its population was 430 in 2012.

Located in the east of the municipality, Caldones is a rural area which borders the municipality of Villaviciosa in the east, with the districts of Vega and Llavandera in the west, and with the district of Valdornón in the south.

Villages and their neighbourhoods
Caldones
El Barriu la Ilesia
La Cruz
El Peñón
Garbelles
La Bustia
Garbelles de Baxo
Garbelles de Riba
El Serraderu
Llaneces
La Llomba
Llinares
Riosecu
La Cabaña'l Marqués
El Curullu
Robleo
El Balagón
El Cantu Mareo
La Llomba
San Pelayo
Bovies
Los Villares

External links
 Official Toponyms - Principality of Asturias website.
 Official Toponyms: Laws - BOPA Nº 229 - Martes, 3 de octubre de 2006 & DECRETO 105/2006, de 20 de septiembre, por el que se determinan los topónimos oficiales del concejo de Gijón.

Parishes in Gijón